Crotalaria sagittalis, known as arrowhead rattlebox or just rattlebox, is an annual wildflower native to the United States, Midwestern and Eastern states.

Description
Rattlebox grows 6-12" tall with alternate, short-petiolate leaves and a yellow flower that yields a plump seed pod that will rattle when shaken. It is a member of the Crotalaria genus, which has 500 members commonly known as rattlepods 
.

References

External links
 https://www.illinoiswildflowers.info/prairie/plantx/rattlebox.htm
 http://www.missouriplants.com/Yellowalt/Crotalaria_sagittalis_page.html

sagittalis